Luka Ilić (born 2 July 1999) is a Serbian professional footballer who plays as a central midfielder for Serbian club TSC Bačka Topola.

Club career

Red Star Belgrade
Luka started playing football with local football club Filip Filipović at the age of 7, along with his younger brother Ivan. Later he played with football club Real Niš until 2014, when he joined Red Star Belgrade. He joined the first team in for the 2016–17 season under coach Miodrag Božović, making his senior debut for the team in a friendly match against Ludogorets Razgrad on 14 November 2015. Ilić signed his first professional contract with Red Star Belgrade in February 2016. During the summer pre-season in 2017, Ilić presented as one of the top ten club's youth prospects. He made his official debut for the club on 6 July 2017, replacing Slavoljub Srnić in second leg of the first qualifying round for 2017–18 UEFA Europa League against Floriana. Several days later, Red Star accepted an offer from the English side Manchester City and Ilić had been sold for a €5 million net fee along with his younger brother Ivan. Within the arrangement, Luka returned at one-year loan deal to Red Star. Ilić made his Serbian SuperLiga debut on 13 August 2017, as a substitution for Nemanja Milić in the match against OFK Bačka. He scored his first senior goal in 4–0 victory over Mačva Šabac on 14 October 2017.

NAC Breda
Ilić signed for Dutch side NAC Breda on loan for the 2018–19 season. On 3 August 2019, it was announced that Ilić would spend another year on loan at NAC despite their relegation.

FC Twente
Ilić was announced as a FC Twente loan signing on transfer deadline day for the 2020–21 season. On 8 July 2021, it was announced he would spend another year on loan at the club. After making only five appearances it was announced that Ilić would not be continuing with the team after the winter break, cutting his loan spell short and returning to his parent club.

Troyes
In January 2022 Ilić made a permanent transfer to French side Troyes. He signed contract until summer of 2024.

Style of play
As a left-footed player, Ilić performed at all position in midfield through the youth career. In early years of playing football, he usually performed more offensive as a second striker or attacking midfielder. Joining the youth team of Red Star Belgrade, Ilić converted his position, playing as right-side central midfielder, and later as a defensive midfielder with a box-to-box role, being paired with his brother. He characterized by lucidity and great performances face to face game against the opponent. Ilić is also free-kick taker.

Personal life
Born in Niš, Ilić grew up in a sports family. His father Srđan played as a winger in Radnički Niš and his mother Danijela Ilić played basketball professionally. Luka's younger brother, Ivan is also a professional footballer.

International career
Ilić made his debut and first international goal for Serbia on 25 January 2023 in a friendly match against United States which Serbia won 2–1. He was a starter in that game and scored his first international goal.

Career statistics

International

Scores and results list the Serbia's goal tally first, score column indicates score after each Ilić's goal.

Career statistics

Club

Honours
Red Star Belgrade
Serbian SuperLiga: 2017–18

References

External links
 
 
 
 
 

1999 births
Living people
Sportspeople from Niš
Association football midfielders
Serbian footballers
Serbian SuperLiga players
Eredivisie players
Eerste Divisie players
Red Star Belgrade footballers
Manchester City F.C. players
NAC Breda players
FC Twente players
ES Troyes AC players
FK TSC Bačka Topola players
Serbia under-21 international footballers
Serbia youth international footballers
Serbian expatriate footballers
Expatriate footballers in the Netherlands
Serbian expatriate sportspeople in the Netherlands
Expatriate footballers in France
Serbian expatriate sportspeople in France
Serbia international footballers